Amphimallon solstitiale, also known as the summer chafer or European june beetle, is a beetle similar to the cockchafer but much smaller, approximately  in length. They are declining in numbers now, but where found they are often seen in large numbers. At dusk they actively fly around tree tops looking for a mate and can often be found drowning in pools of water the following morning. They are also attracted to light and come in through open, lit windows and fly around lamps, making quite a racket while bumping into lights. They are found throughout the Palearctic region (and North America) and, commonly seen from June to August, living in meadows, hedgerows, and gardens, and eating plants and tree foliage.

These June Beetles are also pests due to eating the roots of potatoes, rape, and legume plants. This can be a problem since not as many of these plants grow which results in them having pathogens on them, causing the food to dry and die. Because of this, chemical pesticides or certain bacteria are used to help keep these insects away.

Distribution
The species can be found in such countries as Belgium, Estonia, Latvia, Slovenia, Czech Republic, Slovakia, Poland, 
Croatia, Serbia, France, Luxembourg, Bulgaria, Switzerland, Sweden, Austria, Greece, Italy, Spain, Germany, southern parts of Russia, Mexico and Great Britain

References

BİRYOL, S., EFE, D., ESKİ, A., DEMİRBAĞ, Z., & DEMİR, İ. (2020). Fungal pathogens of Amphimallon solstitiale Linnaeus, 1758 (Coleoptera: Scarabaeidae). Turkish Journal of Entomology, 375–384. https://doi.org/10.16970/entoted.663690

Tolasch, T., Sölter, S., Tóth, M., Ruther, J., & Francke, W. (2003). (R)-Acetoin-Female Sex Pheromone of the Summer Chafer Amphimallon solstitiale (L.) Journal of Chemical Ecology, 29(4), 1045–1050. https://doi.org/10.1023/a:1022992516854

Xing-Zhuo Yang, Li Zhang, Run-Qiu Feng, Li-Jun Zhang, Fang-Zhen Luo & Ming-Long Yuan (2019) Mitochondrial genome of Amphimallon solstitiale (Coleoptera: Scarabaeidae: Melolonthinae) and phylogenetic analysis, Mitochondrial DNA Part B, 4:1, 110-111, DOI: 10.1080/23802359.2018.1536482

External links

 Amphimallon solstitiale page on Encyclopedia of Life

Beetles described in 1758
solstitiale
Beetles of Europe
Taxa named by Carl Linnaeus